Áed Dibchine mac Senaig (died 595) was a King of Leinster from the Uí Máil branch of the Laigin. He is the first king of this branch to hold the overlordship of Leinster.

The Book of Leinster king lists mention a certain Áed Cerr mac Colmáin who appears as genealogically related to the Uí Dúnlainge and is made to appear this way as the son of Colmán Már mac Coirpre. However, it is Aed Dibchine who was the king at this time. The king lists of the Book of Leinster appear falsified for the 6th century to give greater claim to the Ui Dunlainge which prevents a clear picture of this era in Leinster

His sons were Rónán Crach, possibly the Leinster king mentioned in the saga "Fingal Rónáin" (The Kinslaying of Rónán); and Crimthann mac Áedo (died 633), a king of Leinster.

Notes

See also
Kings of Leinster

References

 Annals of Tigernach at CELT: Corpus of Electronic Texts at University College Cork
 Charles-Edwards, T. M. (2000), Early Christian Ireland, Cambridge: Cambridge University Press, 
 Byrne, Francis John (2001), Irish Kings and High-Kings, Dublin: Four Courts Press, 
 Book of Leinster,Rig Laigin at CELT: Corpus of Electronic Texts at University College Cork

External links
CELT: Corpus of Electronic Texts at University College Cork

595 deaths
Kings of Leinster
6th-century Irish monarchs
People from County Wicklow
Year of birth unknown